Sindanminsa, literally "History of the Divine Tangun's People", is a Korean history book according to views of Daejongism. It covers the period from the founding of the Gojoseon through the Joseon Dynasty, and was written by Kim Gyoheon(2nd leader of religion Daejongism) in 1904.

The treatise divides Korean history into ten chronological segments: Shinshi, Gojoseon, Buyeo, Proto–Three Kingdoms period, North South States Period, Goryeo and Liao Dynasty, Goryeo and Jin dynasty, Goryeo, Joseon, and Korea Empire.

Content
The book covers history from the Shinshi era from 1894.The book also includes Mohe, xianbei,khitan. jurchen and Manchurian kingdoms, as it considers it part of korean history in the perspective that they were all in manchuria which was korean land in the time of Goguryeo.Here is the book contents list:

Volume 1 Earliest of the Ancients

Chapter 1 Shinshi era

Chapter 2 Baedal era(Gojoseon)

Chapter 3 Buyeo era

Chapter 4 Religion

Chapter 5 Law

chapter 6 Literature and technology 

Chapter 7 Customs

Volume2 Ancient medieval times

Chapter 1 Proto–Three Kingdoms period(Yeolguksidae)

Chapter 2  Northern and Southern States period

Chapter 3 Religion

Chapter 4 Law

chapter 5 Literature and technology 

Chapter 6 Customs

Volume 3 Early modern period.

Chapter 1  Goryeo and Liao dynasty period

Chapter 2 Goryeo and Jin dynasty period

Chapter 3 Goryeo period

Chapter 4 Religion

Chapter 5 Law

chapter 6 Literature and technology 

Chapter 7 Customs

Volume 4 Modern period

Chapter 1 Joseon period

Chapter 2 Joseon and Qing dynasty

Chapter 3 Religion

Chapter 4 Law

chapter 5 Literature and technology 

Chapter 6 Customs

Notes

History books about Korea
1904 non-fiction books
Dangun